Haverfordwest Rugby Football Club is a rugby union team from the town of Haverfordwest, West Wales. The club is a member of the Welsh Rugby Union and is a feeder club for the Llanelli Scarlets.

Club badge
The club badge depicts a phoenix rising from the ashes. This represents the teams reformation after the club was disbanded during World War I.

Club honours
 WRU Division Three West, 2010-11 - Champions

Notable former players
 Peter Morgan (4 caps)
 Richard Summers (1 cap)
 Rob Evans (39 caps)

External links
Haverfordwest RFC Official club site.

References

Rugby clubs established in 1875
Welsh rugby union teams
Sport in Pembrokeshire
Haverfordwest